Orpheus is an unincorporated community in Bloomfield Township, Jackson County, Ohio, United States.

Location

Establishments
The Orpheus Post Office was established on September 15, 1888, and discontinued on September 14, 1907.  Mail service is now handled through the Rempel branch.

References 

Unincorporated communities in Jackson County, Ohio